Campus School may refer to one of many schools located at campuses of universities:

 India
 Campus School, GBPUA&T, in Pantnagar, Uttarakhand
 Campus School, CCS HAU, in Hisar, Haryana
 Campus School, IIT Powai, in Powai, Maharashtra
 Campus School, IIT Kanpur, in Kanpur, Uttar Pradesh
 Campus School, in Ghaziabad, Uttar Pradesh
 Campus School, Madras Christian College, in Madras, Tamil Nadu
 Campus School, BPS Women's University, in Sonipat, Haryana
 Campus School, MDU, in Rohtak, Haryana
 Campus School, MESCE in Kuttippuram, Kerala
 Campus School, University of Hyderabad, in Hyderabad, Andhra Pradesh
 Campus School, CSJMU in Kanpur, Uttar Pradesh

 USA
 Discovery Canyon Campus School, in Colorado Springs, Colorado
 David Lipscomb Campus School, in Nashville, Tennessee
 University Park Campus School, in Worcester, Massachusetts, 
 Smith College Campus School, in Northampton, Massachusetts
 The Campus School of Carlow University, in Pittsburgh, Pennsylvania